Sam Teskey (born 1989) is an Australian blues musician, best known for his work with the Teskey Brothers. Sam won the ARIA Award for Engineer of the Year in 2019.

His debut studio album, Cycles, was released on 8 October 2021 via Ivy League Records.

Life and career

1989–2007: Early life
Sam Teskey was born in 1989 at his parents home in Warrandyte, Victoria, in the room above what is now their studio. He attended a local primary school with no year levels. He was close to his brother Josh, with Josh saying in 2021, "We had these bird calls we'd do so we could always find each other in bush near where we lived. We also used them at parties when we were teenagers. I'd do the call and Sam would materialise out of the crowd." The two started playing music together after moving to a Steiner high school when Josh was 15 and Sam 13. Josh said "I jumped straight into singing and then played guitar, but Sam focused on the guitar".

2008–present: The Teskey Brothers

In 2008, Josh and Sam formed the blues rock band, the Teskey Brothers alongside Brendon Love and Liam Gough. The band became a fixture at the St Andrews Market, performing at regular spots in Warrandyte and bars in Melbourne, as well as other private shows. The band released their debut studio album, Half Mile Harvest in 2017 which peaked at number 18 on the ARIA Charts. The band's second studio album, Run Home Slow was released in 2019 and peaked at number 2 on the ARIA Charts and won three ARIA Music Awards at the 2019 awards.

2020–present: Solo career and Cycles

On 13 July 2021, Teskey announced the release of his debut solo album Cycles, followed by his first solo nationwide tour and lead single "Love". Cycles was released on 8 October 2021.

Discography

Studio albums

Singles

Awards and nominations

APRA Awards
The APRA Awards are held in Australia and New Zealand by the Australasian Performing Right Association to recognise songwriting skills, sales and airplay performance by its members annually. Josh Teskey has been nominated for three awards.

! 
|-
| 2019 
| "Forever You and Me" 
| Song of the Year
| 
| 
|-
! scope="row" rowspan="3"| 2020
| rowspan="2"| "I Get Up" 
| Song of the Year
| 
| rowspan="3"| 
|-
| Most Performed Blues & Roots Work of the Year
| 
|-
| The Teskey Brothers 
| Breakthrough Songwriter of the Year 
| 
|-
! scope="row"| 2021
| "Rain" 
| Most Performed R&B / Soul Work
| 
| 
|}

ARIA Awards
The ARIA Music Awards is an annual awards ceremony that recognises excellence, innovation, and achievement across all genres of Australian music.

! 
|-
! scope="row"| 2019
| Sam Teskey for the Teskey Brothers – Run Home Slow
| Engineer of the Year
| 
| 
|}

References

External links
 

1989 births
Australian rock guitarists
ARIA Award winners
APRA Award winners
Living people
The Teskey Brothers members
People from Warrandyte, Victoria
21st-century Australian musicians
Musicians from Melbourne